Elak, King of Atlantis is a collection of sword and sorcery short stories by English author Adrian Cole, continuing the stories featuring the title character by American author Henry Kuttner. It was first published in trade paperback and ebook by Pulp Hero Press in July 2020; an ebook edition followed from the same publisher in October of the same year.

Summary
The book collects five of the author's "Elak" stories, two of them original to the collection, together with a foreword by Robert M. Price and a prologue by the author.

Contents
"Foreword: Before the Oceans Drank Atlantis" (Robert M. Price)
"Prologue: Uneasy Lies the Head That Wears the Crown"
"Blood of the Moon God" (from Strange Tales no. 10, Sep. 5, 2007)
"Witch Queen of Doom Island" (from Worlds of the Unknown v. 1, Jan. 2015)
"Revenge of the Sorcerer"
"Spawn of the Sea God" (from The Mighty Warriors, May 2018)
"Sky Warriors of Atlantis"

References

2020 short story collections
Fantasy short story collections
Atlantis in fiction